Raymond Vincent Gardner (October 25, 1901 – May 3, 1968) was an American professional baseball shortstop and second baseman who appeared in 115 career games in Major League Baseball for the Cleveland Indians in  and .

Gardner played 12 seasons of professional ball, beginning in 1920. In his tenth year, 1929, he played in 82 games for Cleveland, 77 as the starting shortstop, and batted .262 with 67 hits. The following season, however, he played only 22 games in the field (without a single start), and collected only one hit in 13 at bats, scoring seven runs. All told, he batted .253 lifetime, with three doubles, two triples and one home run (hit June 29, 1929, at Navin Field off Emil Yde of the Detroit Tigers) among his 68 total hits. He had 25 runs batted in.

He retired from baseball in 1933 after playing 23 games at the highest level of the minors that season.

References

External links

1901 births
1968 deaths
Baseball players from Maryland
Charlotte Hornets (baseball) players
Cleveland Indians players
Hagerstown Champs players
Frederick Hustlers players
Jersey City Skeeters players
Major League Baseball shortstops
New Orleans Pelicans (baseball) players
Sacramento Senators players
Sportspeople from Frederick, Maryland